Also see Oil City, in Venango County, Pennsylvania.

Oil City is an unincorporated community in east-central Cambria County, Pennsylvania, United States, located at the confluence of Bens Creek and the Little Conemaugh River. The bridge over Bens Creek is on the National Register of Historic Places.

References

Unincorporated communities in Cambria County, Pennsylvania
Unincorporated communities in Pennsylvania